Miguel Mir Rodon (born 18 April 1956) is a former professional tennis player from Spain.

Career
Mir made his first Grand Slam appearance at the 1975 French Open, where he was beaten in the opening round by Roger Taylor. He didn't return to the tournament until 1980, when he again made a first round exit, with Brian Gottfried winning in straight sets. A month later he played in the 1980 Wimbledon Championships and lost to Steve Krulevitz in the opening round. His final attempt at registering a win came at the 1981 French Open, but he was beaten once more, this time by Billy Martin. He did however make the second round of the doubles, with partner José López-Maeso. The pair had a win over Jimmy Arias and Ben Testerman.
 
The Spaniard took part in one Davis Cup tie for his country, in 1981, against Algeria. He teamed up with José López-Maeso in the doubles rubber, to defeat the Algerian pairing of Yassine Amier and Djamel Boudjemline.

Challenger titles

Singles: (1)

References

1956 births
Living people
Spanish male tennis players
Tennis players from Barcelona
Mediterranean Games silver medalists for Spain
Mediterranean Games medalists in tennis
Competitors at the 1975 Mediterranean Games